Industry is an extinct town in Henry County, in the U.S. state of Missouri.

Industry was platted in 1883.  A post office called Industry was established in 1881, and remained in operation until 1887.

References

Ghost towns in Missouri
Former populated places in Henry County, Missouri